Carter Benedict Burwell (born November 18, 1954) is an American film composer. He has consistently collaborated with the Coen brothers, having scored most of their films. Burwell has also scored three of Todd Haynes' films, three of Spike Jonze's films, and all the films of Martin McDonagh. He has received Academy Awards nominations for Best Original Score for Haynes's Carol (2015) and McDonagh's films Three Billboards Outside Ebbing, Missouri (2017) and The Banshees Of Inisherin (2022).

Early life and education
Burwell was born in New York City, the son of Natalie (née Benedict), a math teacher, and Charles Burwell, who founded Thaibok Fabrics, Ltd. He graduated from King School in Stamford, Connecticut with George Hofecker and other notables and Harvard College, where he was a cartoonist for The Harvard Lampoon.

Career
As a film composer, Burwell has had a long-working relationship with the Coen brothers, providing music for every film they have made (except for O Brother, Where Art Thou? and Inside Llewyn Davis, which had folk music soundtracks produced by T-Bone Burnett). Among his best known film scores are Miller's Crossing (1990), And the Band Played On (1993), Conspiracy Theory (1997), Hamlet (2000), The Spanish Prisoner (1997), Before the Devil Knows You're Dead (2007), In Bruges (2008), Twilight (2008), Where the Wild Things Are (2009), The Blind Side (2009), and Breaking Dawn - Part 1 (2011) and Part 2 (2012). Burwell wrote and recorded the original score for the film The Bourne Identity, but his version was replaced by director Doug Liman for one by John Powell.

Ultimately the ethos of the punk rock movement gave Burwell the impetus to start performing. He performed in New York with several bands, notably The Same, Thick Pigeon, and Radiante. Burwell played in Thick Pigeon with Stanton Miranda; the group released two albums, Too Crazy Cowboys (Factory) and tracks on Miranda Dali (Crepuscule), originally released as a Miranda solo project but later reissued as a Thick Pigeon release. On Burwell's soundtrack for Psycho III, Miranda was a featured singer.

By 1986 he had composed the music for a dance piece, RAB, which premiered at the Avignon Festival. At the same time, he was touring worldwide with The Harmonic Choir, David Hykes' experimental vocal group, which specialized in overtone singing.

Burwell used the country music genre as the basis for his score for the Coens' Raising Arizona in 1987. From 1982 to 1987 he worked at the New York Institute of Technology.

His work has alternated between live performance, dance and theater commissions, and film scoring. His chamber opera, The Celestial Alphabet Event, was presented in New York in 1991, and other theater pieces include Mother (1994) and Lucia's Chapters (2007), both with the experimental theater group Mabou Mines.

In April 2005 Burwell composed and conducted music performed by The Parabola Ensemble for the plays Sawbones, written and directed by the Coen brothers, Hope Leaves the Theater, written and directed by Charlie Kaufman, and Anomalisa, written and directed by Kaufman as Francis Fregoli. This was a segment of the sound-only production "Theater of the New Ear", which debuted at St. Ann's Warehouse in Brooklyn, New York, with support from Sirius Satellite Radio. It was also performed at the Royal Festival Hall in London, England, in May 2005, and at Royce Hall in Los Angeles, California, in September 2005, as part of the UCLA Live Festival.

In 2009, Burwell was the recipient of the ASCAP Henry Mancini Award from the American Society of Composers, Authors and Publishers. In 2010, he was nominated for the Golden Globe Award for Best Original Score for Where the Wild Things Are.

In 2015, he received the Distinguished Film Composer award from the Middleburg Film Festival, and the Los Angeles Film Critics Association award for Best Music Score for Anomalisa and Carol. He was nominated for the Annie Award for Music in an Animated Feature Production for Anomalisa and the Golden Globe Award for Best Original Score for Carol.   In 2016, he received the Satellite Award for Best Original Score and the Best Score award by the International Cinephile Society for Carol. Burwell was awarded Film Composer of the Year by the World Soundtrack Awards, and the score for Carol received the Public Choice Award for the Best Score of the Year.

Burwell received his first Academy Award for Best Original Score nomination for Carol, his second for Three Billboards Outside Ebbing, Missouri, and his third for The Banshees Of Inisherin .

Personal life
Burwell married Christine Sciulli in 1999.

 Burwell lives in Napeague, New York.

Filmography

Films

Television

References

External links
 
 
 Thick Pigeon bio at LTM

1954 births
American film score composers
Animated film score composers
Harvard College alumni
The Harvard Lampoon alumni
Living people
American male film score composers
Musicians from New York City
New York Institute of Technology faculty
Varèse Sarabande Records artists